Jean-Marc Germain (born 12 June 1966) is a French politician, member of the Socialist Party. He is the cabinet director of Martine Aubry in Socialist Party. Germain is also the husband of Anne Hidalgo, mayor of Paris.

In the legislative election 2012, he was elected deputy of Hauts-de-Seine's 12th constituency.

Professional career 
A graduate of the École Polytechnique, in 1992 he joined the Department of Forecasting at the Ministry of Economy and Finance. In August 1997, he joined the firm of Martine Aubry at the Ministry of Employment and Solidarity as a technical advisor, then in 2000 the office of Lionel Jospin at Matignon. In 2003, he found Martine Aubry in the urban community of Lille Métropole, as Deputy Director General of Services. Still with Martine Aubry, he became in 2005 general director of services of the city of Lille, and in 2008 director of cabinet of Martine Aubry, then both president of Lille metropolis and first secretary of the Socialist Party.

Personal life 
In June 2004, he married Anne Hidalgo, then deputy mayor of Paris, encountered Martine Aubry firm in 1993. Together they have a son, Arthur, was born in 2001. It is the mayor of Paris, Bertrand Delanoë, who officiated the marriage, of which Martine Aubry is one of the witnesses.

Political career

National Mandates 
On June 17, 2012, Jean-Marc Germain was elected MP for the twelfth district of Hauts-de-Seine in the second round of the legislative election, after a duel with Philippe Pemezec.

He is part of the group of deputies known as "slingers".

In the 2017 parliamentary elections, he was eliminated in the first round, in 4th position with 9.24% of the votes.

Political Functions 
He is the former cabinet director of Martine Aubry in the Socialist Party (PS). In 2012, following the Toulouse Congress, he was appointed National Secretary for Employment and Labor. In March 2014, he became National Secretary for La Francophonie.

He supported Benoît Hamon in the second round of the primary citizen of 2017 and became co-director of his presidential campaign with MP Mathieu Hanotin.

On July 8, 2017, he joined the PS collegiate leadership.

Works 
Tout avait si bien commencé : journal d'un « frondeur », éditions de l'Atelier, 2015.

References
Jamais sans Martine
Ces fidèles qui entourent Martine Aubry
http://kx.polytechniciens.com/?page=AX_FICHE_ANCIEN&ancc_id=19870126
http://www.bibliotheque.polytechnique.fr/ 
https://web.archive.org/web/20130111014913/http://www.parismatch.com/People-Match/Politique/Actu/Jean-Marc-Germain-le-mari-d-Anne-Hidalgo-209769/
https://www.legifrance.gouv.fr/affichTexte.do?cidTexte=JORFTEXT000000368156&dateTexte=
https://www.lesechos.fr/elections/resultats/legislatives/hauts-de-seine-92/12eme-circonscription-hauts-de-seine/
https://www.lemonde.fr/primaire-de-la-gauche/article/2017/01/23/primaire-a-gauche-martine-aubry-et-ses-proches-voteront-pour-benoit-hamon_5067560_5008374.html
https://www.lemonde.fr/election-presidentielle-2017/article/2017/02/07/jean-marc-germain-et-mathieu-hanotin-codirigeront-la-campagne-de-benoit-hamon_5076122_4854003.html
https://www.lemonde.fr/politique/article/2017/07/08/le-parti-socialiste-a-l-heure-de-la-refondation_5157740_823448.html

1966 births
Living people
École Polytechnique alumni
Socialist Party (France) politicians
Politicians from Lyon
Deputies of the 14th National Assembly of the French Fifth Republic